ʿĀṣim ibn ʿAmr ibn Mālik al-Usaydī al-Tamīmī was a prominent member of Banu Tamim and military leader of Rashidun Caliphate during the rule of Abu Bakr and Umar.

He played an active role during the Muslim conquest of Persia accompanying his older brother Al-Qa'qa' ibn Amr al-Tamimi.

References 

7th-century Arabs
People of the Muslim conquest of Persia